Daniel Buckley (born 1957) is an Irish former hurler who played at club level with Blackrock and at inter-county level with the Cork senior hurling team. He usually lined out as a forward.

Playing career

Buckley first came to prominence at juvenile and underage levels with the Blackrock club. After being a part of the inaugural Féile na nGael-winning team in 1971, he later enjoyed club championship successes at minor and under-21 levels. As a member of the Blackrock senior team, he won an All-Ireland Club Championship medal in 1979. At inter-county level, Buckley first appeared on the Cork team that won the All-Ireland Minor Championship title in 1974, before later winning an All-Ireland Under-21 Championship title in that grade in 1976. He was drafted onto the Cork senior hurling team in 1979 and won a Munster Championship title as a substitute that year. Buckley was also a part of Cork's National Hurling League success in 1980 before later being released from the panel.

Honours

Blackrock
All-Ireland Senior Club Hurling Championship: 1979
Munster Senior Club Hurling Championship: 1978, 1979
Cork Senior Hurling Championship: 1978, 1979, 1985
Féile na nGael: 1971

Cork
Munster Senior Hurling Championship: 1979
National Hurling League: 1979-80
All-Ireland Under-21 Hurling Championship: 1976
Munster Under-21 Hurling Championship: 1975, 1976, 1977
All-Ireland Minor Hurling Championship: 1974
Munster Minor Hurling Championship: 1974, 1975

References

1957 births
Living people
St Michael's (Cork) Gaelic footballers
Blackrock National Hurling Club hurlers
Cork inter-county hurlers
Cork inter-county Gaelic footballers
Hurling forwards
Dual players